Shikarpur ( and ) ) is city and the capital of Shikarpur District in Sindh province of Pakistan. It is situated about 29 km west of the right bank of the Indus, with a railway station, 37 km north-west of Sukkur. It is the 42nd largest city of Pakistan by population according to the 2017 census.

History
According to a few historians the city of Shikarpur was revived during the Kalhora rule and that was what brought about a turnaround in making it the financial capital of not only South Asia but also of Central Asia. Some people think that the city was founded by Kalhoras' cousins Daudpotas --- and it was named Shikarpur because the Talpur Mirs were fond of shikar (hunting). Another school of thought believes Shikarpur was admittedly there before the shikar-loving Talpurs arrived on the scene; for another, Shikarpur has always been a trading and banking center, and never a hunting lodge. Some experts think that Shikarpur is really Shakaripur --- the "town founded by the vanquisher of the Shakas", the Scythian.

Shikarpur, the seat of civilisation, culture, trade and commerce acquired political and economic importance because of its strategic location on the map of Sindh, being directly accessible to those who came from Central and West Asia through the Bolan Pass. In the early 17th century this emerald city in the northern Sindh province of Pakistan became the nucleus of a historical trade center on a caravan route through the Bolan Pass into Afghanistan. Shikarpur became the core of manufactures including brass and metal goods, carpets, cotton cloth, and embroidery. Its great bazaar (covered because of the summer heat) is famous throughout Turkistan and southern Asia.

The predominantly Muslim population supported Muslim League and Pakistan Movement. After the independence of Pakistan in 1947, the minority Hindus migrated to India while the Muslims refugees from India settled down in the Shikarpur District.

Demography 
The population of Shikarpur District was estimated to be 1,231,481 in 2017. The predominant population is Sindhi. There are significant Urdu, Baloch, Brahui, speaking communities in Shikarpur. The population is mainly Muslim. There is a small Hindu minority in the city as most Hindus migrated to India after independence in 1947.

Geography 
Shikarpur District has an area of 2640 square kilometers, divided into four "talukas": 
 Shikarpur, Sindh
 Lakhi, 
 Garhi Yasin 
 Khanpur, Sindh
Its borders meet with districts of Larkana, Jacobabad, Khairpur & Sukkur. Two National Highways (N-65 & N-55) intersect in the city of Shikarpur, so it can well be termed as, one of the junction points of the four provinces.

The district has a total road length of 920.0 kilometers, including 125.0 kilometers of National Highways and 195.0 kilometers of Provincial Highways. It is, thus, deficient in road density (0.35 km/Km2) compared with recognized international parameters of development (1 km/Km2). During the last few years, creeping development activity has taken place and 71.0 kilometers of road, 94 schools and a number of schemes in drainage, health and other sectors have been completed, under various programs. Basically, agrarian economy of district Shikarpur is dependent upon non-perennial irrigation system, so the district is always in semi-drought conditions. The last spell of drought is particularly notable as it created heavy unemployment and unsustainable poverty, which without any doubt created serious law and order situations.

Boundaries
The District is bounded on the north and east by Jacobabad District in the south by Sukkur District on the west by Indus River and Larkana District.

Gates of Shikarpur
The town consists of seven gates named Lakhi-dar, Hathi-dar, Hazari-dar, Civi-dar, Karan-dar, Wagono-dar, Khanpur-dar, and one window named Siddiqui Mari.

Covered Market or Dhak Bazar

Located in the center of the old city, Dhak Bazaar or covered market is a long, narrow street with shops on either sides. It is covered with woodwork of pure teak. It has been serving as a cool shade during the hot summers. Shikarpur along with other contemporary cities like Bukhara, Samarkand, and Istanbul at that time had a covered street market.

Healthcare
Rai Bahadur Udhaudas Tarachand Hospital (Civil Hospital)
Hiranand Gangabai Ladies Hospital

Education
Notable educational institues located in Shikarpur include Shaikh Ayaz University and Chellaram and Seetaldas College. Institutes have their own libraries, but there is only one public library in Shikarpur named "Qadir Bux Bedil Library".

Notable People

Gallery

See also
 Shikarpuri achar
 Garhi Yasin
 Khanpur, Sindh
 Thul
 Sultan Kot
 Mian Jo Goth

References

General references
 Markovits, Claude The Global World of Indian Merchants 1750-1947 Traders of Sind from Bukhara to Panama, Cambridge, Cambridge University Press, 2004, pp. 65–217.

External links

 History of Shikarpur
 Complete list of  Shikarpur Postcodes
 Shikarpur Area Code

Populated places in Sindh
Shikarpur District